Sudha Ragunathan is an Indian Carnatic vocalist, singer and composer. She was conferred the Kalaimamani award by the Government of Tamil Nadu in 1994, Padma Shri (2004) and Padma Bhushan (2015) by the Government of India, and Sangeetha Kalanidhi by Madras Music Academy in 2013.

Early life and education
Sudha Ragunathan (née Sudha Venkatraman) was born in Chennai on 30 April 1956 and later shifted to Bangalore. She did her schooling in Good Shepherd Convent, Chennai. She studied at Ethiraj College, and obtained a postgraduate degree in economics.

Musical career

Training
Sudha Ragunathan received her initial training in Carnatic music from her mother V. Choodamani. From the age of three, she began to learn bhajans, Hindu devotional songs. Her tutelage continued under B. V. Lakshman.  In 1977, she received an Indian government scholarship to study music under a doyenne of Carnatic music, Dr. M.L Vasantha Kumari, whose student she remained for thirteen years.

Trained under Dr. ML Vasanthakumari in the gurukula style, it involved considerable amounts of listening to the teacher and other practitioners to absorb their style and oeuvre. Part of her duties involved the accompaniment on the tanpura of her teacher during concerts, and also accompanying her during concerts. In her own words,  "A period of 13 years from 1977 to 1990, a phase of complete absorption and internalisation! There was no teaching in a formal atmosphere. We learnt while being with her during the katcheris (concerts). We would record her singing in our minds and then replay it while learning the intricacies. It was a very challenging and different experience and as I had begun learning very early from her, my mind was like a sponge and absorbed whatever I heard".

As of January 2015, she is preparing to debut in Kollywood as a music director with the upcoming Tamil film 'Thanneer' based on a Novel published in 2009 by Ashoka Mitran.

Performances and critical reception
Sudha Ragunathan has performed at the Madras Music Season every year since 1990, the very year in which her Guru Dr. ML Vasanthakumari breathed her last. She is considered one of India's leading Carnatic performers. In 2013 she was awarded the Sangita Kalanidhi of the Madras Music Academy. She was awarded the Padma Bhushan, India's third-highest civilian honor, in January 2015.

On 2 October 2016, the United Nations released stamp to honour India's Carnatic music artist Bharat Ratna Dr.M S Subbulakshmi and this stamp was presented to Sudha Raghunathan to honour her performance at the United Nations on 2 Oct 2016.

Concert performances
Ragunathan has performed and collaborated with other artists all over the world. She has performed at the United Nations, and the Théâtre de la Ville, Paris. Sudha performed at the Alice Tully Hall, Lincoln Centre, at New York Broadway to commemorate 50 years of the Bharatiya Vidya Bhavan. Sudha is the only Indian vocalist to have participated in the Global Vocal Meeting organized by the 'Burghof,' an Academy of Music and Arts at Lorrach, Germany and produced by Stimmen Voices International Vocal Festival.

Other Music
Ragunathan has also performed as a playback singer in the Tamil cinema. She got her first break as playback singer under Illayaraja in the movie 'Ivan', performing the song,'Enna Enna Sethai'. Besides the Carnatic repertoire, Raghunathan has also explored the world music scene, in particular fusion music.

Teaching
Following Carnatic musicians, Sudha Ragunathan has also taught the tradition to her students. Sudha has launched her own school Sudhaarnava Academy for Musical Excellence on the day of Vijayadashami in 2017. The school has a faculty of her students along with Sudha Ragunathan herself and has conducted lec demonstrations and workshops in many venues across the globe.

Personal life
Sudha married Ragunathan and they have two children.

Charitable works
Sudha is known for her charitable works, and had launched the 'Samudhaaya Foundation' in 1999 of which she is the Founder and Managing Trustee. The Foundation has assisted the under privileged in the areas of child healthcare, infrastructural aid for homes and for heart surgeries for children. The foundation has also raised funds for victims of the Gujarat earthquake and cyclone relief in Orissa.

Albums

Awards
Padma Bhushan award in 2015
Sangita Kalanidhi from Madras Music Academy (2013).
Padma Shri award in 2004
Sangeetha Choodamani, from Sri Krishna Gana Sabha, Chennai (1997).
Kalaimamani award from the state government of Tamil Nadu, India (1993).
Bharat Jyothi from Bharatiya Vidya Bhavan, New York (1988).
Sangeetha Kalasarathy from Parthasarathy Swami Sabha, Chennai, from Shri Jayendra Saraswathi of Kanchi Mutt.
Sangeeta Saraswathi from The Mahasannidanam of Sringeri.
Gana kuyil from Valmiki Manram, Chennai.
Isai Peroli and VST Award from Karthik Fine Arts, Chennai.
Sangita Kokila from Tamil Sangam Navi Mumbai.
"Rama Gana Kalacharya National Award" from Sree Ramaseva Mandali in the year 2017.
Sama Gana Mathanga National Award from Bharatiya Sama Gana Sabha (2017)
"Sangeetha Ratnakara" from Sri Surabharathi Sanskrit and Cultural foundation, Bengaluru.
"Gaana Padhmam" from Brahma Gana Sabha, Chennai.
MLV Platinum Jubilee Award 2003 from Dr. MLV Cultural Trust, Chennai.
Rashtriya Ekta Award at the 57th birth anniversary celebrations of Rajiv Gandhi in recognition of achievements and contribution to fine arts.
Outstanding National Citizen Award 2001 from The National Citizen's Guild, New Delhi.
Gem of India Award 2001 at the All India Achiever's conference in the category of fine arts and culture.
"Seva Ratna Award" 2001 from The Centenarian Trust, Chennai.
"Swara Raga Laya Ratna" from Academy of Indian Music, Melbourne.
"Isai Chelvam" in 2000 from Muthamizh Peravai from Kalaingar Dr.M.Karunanidhi.
"Sivan Isai Selvi" from Papanasam Sivan Rasika Sangam.
"Rasika Kala Ratna" from Rasikapriya, Sydney.
"Gana Sudha Amrithavarshini" from Sree Kanchi Kamakotti Peetam.
"Thennisai Thilakam" from The Federation Tamil Sangams of North America and the Tamil Nadu Foundation, USA.
"Ugaadi Puraskar Award" from Telugu Academy.
"Youth Excellence Award" from Sri Maharajapuram Viswanatha Iyer Trust.
"Woman of Golden Substance 1998-1999" from Rotary Club, Chennai.
"Sangeeta Kala Sironmani" from Nungabakkam Cultural Academy Trust, Chennai.
Sudha received the title of "Nadha Kalanidhi" from Sri Shanmukhananda Sangeetha Sabha, New Delhi in February, 2005.
Padma Sarangapani Cultural Academy honoured Sudha with the 'Padma Sadhana' award on 24 December 2005.
The Tamil Brahmin Association (THAMBRAAS) At Chennai presented Sudha Ragunathan with the 'Award of Excellence' at the Silver Jubilee of State Conference on 25/12/2005.
The Rotary Club of Trichirapalli Fort, Trichy presented Sudha with the 'VOCATIONAL EXCELLENCE Award' on 8 March 2006.
 'Vani Kala Sudhakara' from the Thyaga Brahma Gana Sabha on 9 December 2005.
 'Sangeetha Mamani' from the Sri Rama Bhaktha Jana Samaj, K.K.Nagar, Chennai
 'Nadha Ratnakala' from the Universal Fine Arts, on 21 December 2005.
 'Nadha Kavidha' on 26 December 2005, under the aegis of the music journal, 'Nadha Brahmam'.
"Arsha Kala Bhushanam" from Pujyasri Swami Dayananda Saraswati organized by Arsha Vidya Gurukulam

References

External links
Sudha Ragunathan's Homepage
Sudha Ragunathan's samudhaaya foundation

Living people
Women Carnatic singers
Carnatic singers
Indian women classical singers
Recipients of the Padma Bhushan in arts
Singers from Bangalore
Carnatic composers
Indian women composers
20th-century Indian composers
20th-century Indian singers
Recipients of the Padma Shri in arts
20th-century Indian women singers
20th-century Indian women musicians
21st-century Indian women musicians
21st-century Indian composers
21st-century Indian singers
21st-century Indian women singers
Women musicians from Karnataka
Musicians from Bangalore
1956 births
20th-century women composers
21st-century women composers
Recipients of the Sangeet Natak Akademi Award